was a town located in Higashitsugaru District in central Aomori Prefecture, Japan. It is now a neighborhood of the city, Aomori.

History
Nonai was created by a merger of the villages of Tsutsui, Kobata, Ura, and Hamada on April 1, 1889. The village was elevated to a town in 1952. The town was annexed by Aomori on January 1, 1955 along with several other municipalities.

Geography
Tsutsui was located on the plain that lies between the Hakkōda Mountains and Aomori Bay. The town had two rivers flowing through it, the Komagome River and its tributary, the Arakawa River.

Neighbouring municipalities
These were the neighboring municipalities of Tsutsui just before its incorporation into Aomori.
Aomori

Yokouchi

Transportation
 Japan National Railways
Tōhoku Main Line – currently  Aoimori Railway Line
No train station was extant in the town; however Tsutsui Station was opened to serve the area of the former town in 2014.

References

Dissolved municipalities of Aomori Prefecture